Brachysomida atra is the species subfamily  Lepturinae in the longhorn beetle family. It was described by John Lawrence LeConte in 1850 and is distributed in Alberta, Canada, and the United States.

References

Beetles described in 1850
Beetles of North America
Lepturinae